Drew D. Beckie (born September 30, 1990) is a Canadian former professional soccer player who currently serves as the team manager for Canadian Premier League club Atlético Ottawa.

Early life
Beckie was born in Regina, Saskatchewan. When he was young, Beckie and his family moved to Denver, Colorado.

Club career

Youth
At 15, Beckie was offered a contract with the Vancouver Whitecaps Residency program. From 2005 through 2006, he trained with several German Bundesliga clubs and second Bundesliga clubs such as Eintracht Frankfurt, and 1860 Munich. Also featured in a game vs. Bayern Munich which included Franck Ribery and Thomas Muller. He initially accepted, but ultimately decided to keep his NCAA amateurism and return to Denver, later committing to the University of Denver over several other programs.

Columbus Crew
Beckie was drafted 28th overall by the Columbus Crew in the 2013 MLS SuperDraft. He appeared twice on the bench (vs. Chivas USA, vs. Vancouver Whitecap FC) in the 2013 season but struggled with injury and missed 12 games. He appeared in 10 reserve games for the Crew, scoring one goal and recording an assist. He was released by the Crew in January 2014 after the appointment of Gregg Berhalter, replacing manager Robert Warzycha.

Ottawa Fury
In 2014, he signed with NASL side Ottawa Fury in their inaugural season.

Carolina RailHawks
After two seasons with the Fury, Beckie did not renew his contract with Ottawa Fury FC and was acquired by the Carolina RailHawks on December 17, 2015.

Jacksonville Armada
Beckie played for Jacksonville Armada in the 2017 season, but in November 2017 while training with KuPS FC, a Finnish First Division club, Beckie unexpectedly suffered symptoms that resulted in a sudden trip to a Swedish emergency room and subsequent hospitalization. After numerous medical tests, it was determined that he had contracted a serious virus that would require several months of recovery. Later it was found out that Beckie had suffered cardiac arrest due to a condition known as Myocarditis, a rare heart ailment that occurs when a virus attacks the heart. He recovered and returned to train with Jacksonville Armada FC while out of contract.

Oklahoma City Energy
On June 7, 2018, Beckie was transferred to USL Championship side OKC Energy. That season, he made twenty appearances for the club. In 2019, Beckie made one appearance before departing in May of that year.

El Paso Locomotive
On May 21, 2019, Beckie signed with El Paso Locomotive. He made fifteen league appearances that season and another three in the playoffs. In 2020, Beckie made six appearances for El Paso in a season shortened by the COVID-19 pandemic.

Atlético Ottawa
On May 4, 2021, Beckie returned to Canada, signing with Canadian Premier League side Atlético Ottawa on a two-year deal, with an option for 2023. He made his debut on June 26 in Ottawa's season-opener, starting in central defence against FC Edmonton. During the season Beckie would battle complications from exposure to COVID-19, and missed eight games during his recovery. Upon his return to the side on September 26, Beckie started and scored the opening goal for Ottawa, his first for the club, in an eventual 3–1 victory over Cavalry FC.

On December 3, 2022, the player announced his retirement from soccer. However, on December 22, it was officially announced that he would stay at Atlético Ottawa, having been appointed to the role of Team Manager by the club.

International career
Beckie attended his first Canadian U-17 camp in 2006. Beckie would attend two more camps, one in Mexico City, the other in Florida before attending the 2007 CONCACAF U17 Tournament, but did not appear for the team. In 2008, Beckie attended two Canadian U-20 camps before getting injured before 2009 CONCACAF U-20 Championship. In 2012, Beckie was selected for final squad ahead of the 2012 CONCACAF Men's Olympic Qualifying Championship. Beckie appeared against El Salvador and Cuba, but missed out on the final match against Mexico due to yellow card accumulation. Beckie was called up for the Canadian senior team during his time with the Columbus Crew but could not attend due to injury and has yet to feature for the senior team.

Personal life
Beckie is Catholic. His younger sister Janine Beckie is also a soccer player, and has appeared for the Canadian national women's team. She currently plays for the Portland Thorns of the National Women’s Soccer League (NWSL).

Honours

Atlético Ottawa 
 Canadian Premier League
 Regular Season: 2022

Career statistics

Notes

References

External links 
 
 

1990 births
Living people
Association football defenders
Canadian soccer players
American soccer players
Soccer people from Saskatchewan
Sportspeople from Regina, Saskatchewan
Soccer players from Denver
Denver Pioneers men's soccer players
Real Colorado Foxes players
Ottawa Fury (2005–2013) players
Columbus Crew players
Ottawa Fury FC players
Columbus Crew draft picks
North Carolina FC players
Jacksonville Armada FC players
OKC Energy FC players
El Paso Locomotive FC players
Atlético Ottawa players
USL League Two players
North American Soccer League players
USL Championship players
Canada men's youth international soccer players
Canada men's under-23 international soccer players